Mohammadabad-e Sharqi (also Romanized as Moḩammadābād-e Sharqī; also known as Mo’ammadābād-e Sharqī and Bolverīān) is a village in Sudlaneh Rural District, in the Central District of Quchan County, Razavi Khorasan Province, Iran. At the 2006 census, its population was 307, in 76 families.

References 

Populated places in Quchan County